Pseudeustrotia candidula, the shining marbled, is a moth of the family Noctuidae. The species was first described by Michael Denis and Ignaz Schiffermüller in 1775. It can be found from Europe to Japan.

The wingspan is about 22 mm. The moths flies from May to September depending on the location.

The larvae feed on various plants, including Rumex acetosella and Polygonum bistorta.

External links
 
 
 
 "09122 Pseudeustrotia candidula ([Denis & Schiffermüller], 1775) - Dreieck-Grasmotteneulchen". Lepiforum e. V. Retrieved 28 September 2020.
 Naturkundliches Informationsystem von Marion Kurz, Christof Zeller und Michael Kurz 
 www.schmetterlinge-deutschlands.de
 Naturhistoriska Riksmuseet

Acontiinae
Moths described in 1775
Moths of Europe
Moths of Japan
Moths of Asia
Taxa named by Michael Denis
Taxa named by Ignaz Schiffermüller